The U.S. state of Tennessee receives its power from a variety of sources. The Tennessee Valley Authority (TVA) is the primary utility in Tennessee which generates electricity and sells it to hundreds of local utilities and industrial customers. Like most of the US, the sources used to generate power in Tennessee have changed substantially in the last decade. Coal's share of power has declined from nearly 60% in 2008 to about 25% in 2018, while natural gas has increased significantly. Tennessee is home to the two newest nuclear reactors in the US at Watts Bar Nuclear Plant, unit 2 being the first to begin operation in the 21st century. After Watts Bar Unit 2 began operation in late 2016, nuclear power passed coal as the top source of electricity. In November 2018 natural gas produced more power than coal for the first time in Tennessee. Tennessee is home to the third largest pumped-storage hydroelectric facility in the US, and has the third highest net generation of hydroelectric power of states east of the Mississippi River, and eighth highest nationwide. In 2018, about 57% of the power consumed in Tennessee was generated with emissions free sources. Tennessee is a net consumer of electricity, consuming more power than it generates and receiving power from TVA facilities in neighboring states.

Biomass

Coal

Natural gas
The Tennessee Valley Authority operates nine natural gas power stations in Tennessee. Six of these use simple combustion turbines. Three newer facilities use more efficient combined cycle generators.

Hydroelectric plants

Wind farms

Solar stations

Nuclear plants
The Tennessee Valley Authority operates two nuclear plants in Tennessee. In addition much of the power generated at TVA's Browns Ferry Nuclear Plant in Limestone County, Alabama is distributed to Tennessee.

Former facilities

Coal

Hydroelectric

Cancelled facilities

See also
List of power stations operated by the Tennessee Valley Authority

References

External links 

Power
Tennessee